Paco Rosendo Moncayo Gallegos (born October 8, 1940, in Quito) is an Ecuadorian politician and retired general who was Metropolitan Mayor of Quito from 2000 to 2009.

Career
During his military career, he was the Commander in Chief of the Army in the Alto Cenepa War between Ecuador and Perú. He served as a National Deputy from 1998 to 2000 and was a member of both the National Security Council and its Consultative Assembly for Foreign Affairs. In 2000 Paco Moncayo was elected Metropolitan Mayor of Quito on behalf of the Party of the Democratic Left, and he was re-elected for a second term in 2004. He was co-president of United Cities and Local Governments as of November 2007 and was longlisted for the 2008 World Mayor award.

Between 2009 and 2013 Moncayo was a representative for Pichincha Province in the National Assembly under the Alianza Libertad. He ran for a seat in the Assembly again in the 2013 general election with the Ruptura 25 movement, but failed to win a seat.

2017 Ecuadorian presidential election
Moncayo was a candidate in the February 2017 presidential election, in alliance with Izquierda Democrática, Centro Democrático and Acuerdo Nacional por el Cambio. He placed fourth in the election. His running mate was Monserrat Bustamante Chán, director of Institutional Planning and full-time professor of the Faculty of Marketing and Communication in ECOTEC University.

Honors
He is a Legion of Merit recipient and has been awarded military and civilian Ecuadorian and international decorations.

References

https://web.archive.org/web/20110821084313/http://www.pacomoncayo.ec/

External links
 English translation of bio on Quito Municipality homepage
 UCLG bio
 CityMayors profile

1940 births
Living people
Mayors of Quito
Ecuadorian generals
Democratic Left (Ecuador) politicians
Members of the National Congress (Ecuador)
Members of the first National Assembly (Ecuador)
Commanders of the Legion of Merit
People from Quito
Recipients of the Order of Military Merit (Brazil)